The following radio stations broadcast on AM frequency 1190 kHz: 1190 AM is a United States and Mexican clear-channel frequency.  KEX in Portland, Oregon, and XEWK in Guadalajara, Mexico, share Class A status of 1190 kHz. WOWO, in Fort Wayne, Indiana, is a former Class A station on this frequency but was reduced to Class B when it downgraded its nighttime power in 1999.

In Argentina
 LRA15 Nacional in San Miguel de Tucuman
 LR9 in Buenos Aires

In Canada
 CFSL in Weyburn, Saskatchewan - 10 kW daytime, 5 kW nighttime, transmitter located at

In Mexico
Stations in bold are clear-channel stations.
 XECT-AM in Monterrey, Nuevo León
 XEMBC-AM in Mexicali, Baja California
 XEPP-AM in Orizaba, Veracruz
 XEPZ-AM in Ciudad Juárez, Chihuahua
 XETOT-AM in Tampico, Tamaulipas
 XEWK-AM in Guadalajara, Jalisco - 50 kW daytime, 10 kW nighttime, transmitter located at 
 XEXQ-AM in San Luis Potosí, San Luis Potosí

In the United States
Stations in bold are clear-channel stations.

References

Lists of radio stations by frequency